The William F. Pierce House, also known as Merifield, is a historic house in Eutaw, Alabama.  The house was built by William F. Pierce in 1840.  Pierce purchased the lot for his house from Asa White on May 25, 1839, for $750.  The main living floor is frame, built above a raised basement of brick.  Both levels contain four rooms each.  The main floor has a large central hall.  It was added to the National Register of Historic Places on November 17, 1983, due to its architectural significance.

References

National Register of Historic Places in Greene County, Alabama
Houses on the National Register of Historic Places in Alabama
Houses completed in 1840
Houses in Greene County, Alabama